Type III hypersensitivity, in the Gell and Coombs classification of allergic reactions, occurs when there is accumulation of immune complexes (antigen-antibody complexes) that have not been adequately cleared by innate immune cells, giving rise to an inflammatory response and attraction of leukocytes. There are three steps that lead to this response. The first step is immune complex formation, which involves the binding of antigens to antibodies to form mobile immune complexes. The second step is immune complex deposition, during which the complexes leave the plasma and are deposited into tissues. Finally, the third step is the inflammatory reaction, during which the classical pathway is activated and macrophages and neutrophils are recruited to the affected tissues. Such reactions may progress to immune complex diseases.

Types
Some clinical examples:

Other examples are:
Subacute bacterial endocarditis
Symptoms of malaria

Signs and symptoms
Type III hypersensitivity occurs when there is an excess of antigen, leading to small immune complexes being formed that fix complement and are not cleared from the circulation. It involves soluble antigens that are not bound to cell surfaces (as opposed to those in type II hypersensitivity). When these antigens bind antibodies, immune complexes of different sizes form. Large complexes can be cleared by macrophages but macrophages have difficulty in the disposal of small immune complexes. These immune complexes insert themselves into small blood vessels, joints, and glomeruli, causing symptoms. Unlike the free variant, a small immune complex bound to sites of deposition (like blood vessel walls) are far more capable of interacting with complement; these medium-sized complexes, formed in the slight excess of antigen, are viewed as being highly pathogenic.

Such depositions in tissues often induce an inflammatory response, and can cause damage wherever they precipitate. The cause of damage is as a result of the action of cleaved complement anaphylotoxins C3a and C5a, which, respectively, mediate the induction of granule release from mast cells (from which histamine can cause urticaria), and recruitment of inflammatory cells into the tissue (mainly those with lysosomal action, leading to tissue damage through frustrated phagocytosis by PMNs and macrophages).

The reaction can take hours, days, or even weeks to develop, depending on whether or not there is immunological memory of the precipitating antigen. Typically, clinical features emerge a week following initial antigen challenge, when the deposited immune complexes can precipitate an inflammatory response. Because of the nature of the antibody aggregation, tissues that are associated with blood filtration at considerable osmotic and hydrostatic gradient (e.g. sites of urinary and synovial fluid formation, kidney glomeruli and joint tissues respectively) bear the brunt of the damage. Hence, vasculitis, glomerulonephritis and arthritis are commonly associated conditions as a result of type III hypersensitivity responses.

As observed under methods of histopathology, acute necrotizing vasculitis within the affected tissues is observed concomitant to neutrophilic infiltration, along with notable eosinophilic deposition (fibrinoid necrosis). Often, immunofluorescence microscopy can be used to visualize the immune complexes. Skin response to hypersensitivity of this type is referred to as an Arthus reaction and is characterized by local erythema and some induration. Platelet aggregation, especially in microvasculature, can cause localized clot formation, leading to blotchy hemorrhages. This typifies the response to injection of foreign antigen sufficient to lead to the condition of serum sickness.

The relevance of the Gell and Coombs classification of allergic reactions is questioned in the modern-day understanding of allergy, and it has limited utility in clinical practice.

See also
Type I hypersensitivity
Type II hypersensitivity
Type IV hypersensitivity
Type V hypersensitivity

References

External links 

Hypersensitivity